Henry James Tollit (1835–1904) was an English architect who practised in Oxford.

Tollit trained under William Wilkinson (1819–1901) and was in practice by 1870. He worked in partnership with Edwin Dolby in 1877–78. Tollit was also the county surveyor for Oxfordshire.

His son Reginald James Tollit (born 1870) became an architect and had his own practice in Cambridge. "H.J. Tollit and Lee" are recorded as the firm of architects of the Morris Motors factory built in Longwall Street, Oxford in 1910 but this was six years after H.J. Tollit's death.

Works

St Cross parish church, Oxford: organ chamber and vestry, 1876
St Leonard's parish church, Watlington, Oxfordshire: rebuilding, 1877 (with Dolby)
St Mary the Virgin parish church, Crowell, Oxfordshire: rebuilding, 1878 (with Dolby)
The Eagle Steam Brewery, Park End Street, Oxford: new buildings, 1885
Thame Town Hall, Oxfordshire, 1888
Tower Brewery, Park End Street, Oxford: additional buildings, 1890s–1900s
Archer, Cowley & Co's Cantay Depositories furniture warehouse, Park End Street, Oxford, 1901
County Psychiatric Hospital, Littlemore Hospital, Oxfordshire: additional building, 1902

References

Sources

1835 births
1904 deaths
Architects from Oxford
English ecclesiastical architects
Gothic Revival architects